María Lionza is the central figure in one of the most widespread new religious movements in Venezuela. The cult of María Lionza began in the 20th century as a blend of African, indigenous and Catholic beliefs. She is revered as a goddess of nature, love, peace and harmony. She has followers throughout Venezuelan society, from small rural villages to Caracas, where a monumental statue stands in her honor. The Cerro María Lionza Natural Monument (also known as Sorte mountain) where an important pilgrimage takes place every October, was named in her honour.

Legend and symbols 
According to the main legend,  María Lionza was born in the 15th–16th century as the daughter of an indigenous chief from the region of Yaracuy. Her father sent her to live in the Sorte mountain. One day, while she was by the river, an anaconda attacked and devoured her. From within the serpent, María Lionza begged the mountain for help. The mountain agreed, María Lionza thus disintegrated and merged with Sorte mountain. Sometimes the anaconda is said to have exploded and caused the torrential rains that are common in the region.

María Lionza is sometimes portrayed as an indigenous woman and sometimes as pale-skinned with green eyes, usually surrounded by animals. She is often depicted naked riding a tapir.

María Lionza is sometimes called Yara, an  indigenous alternative name. According to some versions, Yara would have taken the name Santa María de la Onza Talavera del Prato de Nívar or simply Santa María de la Onza ("Saint Mary of the Ounce") under Catholic influence during the Spanish colonization of Venezuela. Subsequently, her name would have been shortened to "María Lionza".

Cult and pilgrimage
The rites of María Lionza take place in the Sorte mountain, near the town of Chivacoa in Yaracuy state, Venezuela. The origins of the cult are uncertain, it is a syncretism of Indigenous, Catholic and African beliefs. Traditions of trance communication (seeking to channel the soul of dead people in a living body) may have started about 19th and 20th century in Latin America, popularized by the teachings of the 19th century Frenchman Allan Kardec. Angelina Pollok-Eltz from Andrés Bello Catholic University in Venezuela, who has worked on the subject, says that the rituals in Sorte started in the early 1920s and were brought to urban areas a decade later.

Maria Lionza followers travel to the mountain for a week each October 12 during the national Day of Indigenous Resistance. In 2011, estimates indicated that about 10% to 30% Venezuelan were followers of the cult. At the time, Venezuelan authorities indicated that about 200 thousands followers participated in the traditions, including foreigners coming from the Americas and Europe. In 2011, Wade Glenn, an anthropologist from Tulane University in the United States, estimated that about 60% of Venezuelan population may have participated in the cult of María Lionza at some point. Glenn argues that the conversational aspect of the rituals may have therapeutical effects.

Members from all Venezuelan social classes participate in the rituals. In local reports, the rituals have been considered to be linked with the late president of Venezuela Hugo Chávez, yet there is little to no evidence. Chávez himself said he did not take part in it, and some followers of María Lionza have said to support him while others dislike Chávez. Some analysts argue that the decline of political power of the Catholic Church during Chávez, along with the crisis in Venezuela, may have led many Venezuelans to seek for help and join the cult. The hyperinflation in Venezuela that started in 2016 has affected the rituals as many are unable to access the materials necessary to carry out the ceremonies.

Traditions and spiritism 

The followers call themselves Marialionceros and refer María Lionza as the "Queen". People go to Sorte mountain seeking for strength, healing and to contact the souls of dead people. During the pilgrimage, the principal shamans and priests of María Lionza come together to pay homage. Many followers wear indigenous costumes and perform a traditional fire walking dance called the "dance of hot coals".

Several spirits are also worshipped during the rituals alongside Catholic saints and Virgin Mary. María Lionza is one of the main "three powers", which also include Guaicaipuro, a legendary indigenous resistance leader of 16th century, and Negro Felipe, a black Afro-American soldier that allegedly participated in the Venezuelan War of Independence. The lower spirits, usually referred as brothers by the pilgrims, are arranged into 'courts', divided by identity: Indigenous, African, Viking, Liberator.  The spirits include farmers, modern criminals and famous historical figures, like  Venezuela 19th century liberator Simón Bolívar. 

The participants cleanse themselves in the muddy rivers to receive the spirits. Shamans take the role of mediums between the pilgrims and the spirits, and usually demand their followers to enter into a trance state which often leads them to speak in tongues or harming themselves. The shamans and the Marialionceros employ blessings, cursing, drum playing, cigar smoking, tobacco chewing, and local liquors during the yearly rituals. Various sources have reported sightings of shamans, sometimes wearing horned helmets, claiming to have contacted the legendary Viking Eric the Red, the first Norse explorer to discover Greenland.

Many members from other religions native to Latin America and Venezuela are present, primarily Santeros (a syncretism between African Yoruba beliefs and Catholicism, known for sacrificing animals to pay homage to Orishas) and Paleros (a syncretic Afro-Cuban religion centered on communicating with the dead).

Monument in Caracas 

One of the most iconic portrayals of María Lionza is the 1951 monument in the Francisco Fajardo Highway in Caracas by Venezuelan sculptor Alejandro Colina. It portrays María Lionza as a muscular naked woman, riding a large tapir which is standing on a snake. Lionza holds a female pelvis, representing fertility, high above her head.

The statue was made for the 1951 Bolivarian Games, to sit outside the Central University of Venezuela (UCV)'s Olympic Stadium, and the Olympic flame was held in the pelvis at the top of the statue during this event. The statue had been commissioned by the dictator Marcos Pérez Jiménez, who wanted to make María Lionza a symbol of Venezuela. The statue was moved to the highway in 1953, after the university and Pérez Jiménez became concerned that the accessible campus location would allow María Lionza's devotees to gather and spread indigenous religion in Venezuela. In 2004 the original statue was moved to a university warehouse and a new casting was put in its place.

In popular culture 
Rubén Blades and Willie Colón's salsa song "María Lionza", from their 1978 album Siembra, is dedicated to the Venezuelan deity.

Former Miss Venezuela Ruddy Rodríguez was the protagonist of María Lionza, a 2006 Venezuelan TV film.

In 2007 film director John Petrizzelli made a documentary entitled Maria Lionza, Breath of Orchids.

In 2009, the New Weird America musician Devendra Banhart composed "María Lionza", published in his album What Will We Be, as an "evocation to the goddess."

The Venezuelan singer Arca paid homage to the goddess in her music video Prada / Rakata released in 2021.

Nick Hakim paid tribute in his music video Cuffed in 2017.

Notes

References

South American deities
Religion in Venezuela
Venezuelan culture
Peace goddesses
Health goddesses
Love and lust goddesses
Nature goddesses
Latin American folklore
Latin American culture
Shamanism of the Americas
Folk saints
1802 births